2nd Infantry Brigade may refer to:

 2nd Infantry Brigade (Australia)
 2nd Infantry Brigade (Estonia)
 2nd Infantry Brigade (Hungary)
 2nd Infantry Brigade (Lebanon)
 2nd Infantry Brigade (New Zealand)
 2nd Infantry Brigade (Romania)
 2nd Infantry Brigade (South Africa)
 2nd Infantry Brigade (United Kingdom)
 2nd Infantry Brigade (United States)